The twenty-fourth season of the American animated sitcom series South Park is its shortest season by episode count, consisting of two extended-length episodes: "The Pandemic Special" and "South ParQ Vaccination Special". The production of the season and the topics of both episodes were shaped by the COVID-19 pandemic.

While broadcast rights have remained with Comedy Central, this is the first season where the exclusive streaming rights have been held by HBO Max.

Production
On August 5, 2021, Comedy Central announced that Parker and Stone signed a $900 million deal for extending the series to 30 seasons through 2027 and 14 feature films, exclusive to the Paramount+ streaming platform owned and operated by Comedy Central's parent company, ViacomCBS. Two films were confirmed to be released at the end of 2021. Parker and Stone later clarified that the projects were television films, and that it was ViacomCBS who decided to advertise them as feature films. Paramount+ promotes the productions as "exclusive events," and subsequent trade publications have identified the productions as television specials.

Episodes

Reception
On Rotten Tomatoes, the season holds a 63% approval rating based on eight reviews; the site editors characterize five as positive and three as negative.

Home media 
The season was released on Blu-ray and DVD on August 16, 2022. A home media release containing South Park: Post Covid and South Park: Post Covid: The Return of Covid was issued on December 6, 2022.

References

 
2020 American television seasons
2021 American television seasons
Television shows about the COVID-19 pandemic